Hope Front may refer to:

 Lespwa, a Haitian political coalition, in French Front de l'Espoir (Hope Front)
 Hope Front (Peru), a Peruvian political party